Amicula may refer to:
 Amicula (chiton), a genus of chitons in the family Mopaliidae
 Amicula (alga), a genus of algae in the family Naviculaceae